Number 39  Squadron is an inactive squadron of the Royal Air Force. It last operated the General Atomics MQ-9A Reaper from Creech AFB, Nevada, between January 2007 and August 2022. It had previously operated the English Electric Canberra PR.7, PR.9 and T.4 from RAF Marham, Norfolk, as No. 39 (1 Photographic Reconnaissance Unit) Squadron between July 1992 and July 2006.

History

First World War
No. 39 Squadron was founded at Hounslow Heath Aerodrome on 15 April 1916 with Royal Aircraft Factory B.E.2s and B.E.12s in an attempt to defend against German Zeppelin raids on London. Having moved to RFC Suttons Farm, 39 Squadron achieved its first success on the night of 2/3 September 1916, when Lieutenant William Leefe Robinson shot down the German Airship Schütte-Lanz SL11, being awarded the Victoria Cross for this action. On 23 September 1916, the German Navy launched another Zeppelin raid against London. Responding to this raid, 2nd Lieutenant Frederick Sowrey of No. 39 Squadron shot down Zeppelin L.32, while Alfred Brandon in another No. 39 Squadron B.E.2 engaged Zeppelin L.33, already damaged by anti-aircraft fire, with L.33 force landing at Little Wigborough, Essex, and being destroyed by its crew. On the night of 1/2 October 1916, 2nd Lieutenant W. L. Tempest of 39 Squadron, flying a B.E.2c, spotted Zeppelin L.31 illuminated by searchlights over southwest London and shot it down with the loss of the entire airship crew.

The squadron continued in the defence of London, supplementing its B.E.2s and B.E.12s with three Royal Aircraft Factory S.E.5s to help deal with daylight attacks by German Gotha bombers, with at least one Armstrong Whitworth F.K.8 also operated by the unit. The squadron re-equipped with Bristol F.2 Fighters in September 1917, but had no more success against German raiders until the night of 19/20 May 1918, when a No. 39 Squadron Bristol Fighter shot down a Gotha bomber. In October 1918, it was re-equipped with Royal Aircraft Factory F.E.2b aircraft and sent to France for night bombing, but was disbanded five days after the Armistice.

Between the wars
It was reformed on 1 July 1919, when No. 37 Squadron based at Biggin Hill was renumbered. The squadron was reduced to a cadre in December 1919, but did not disband, and in April 1921 it was decided to return the Squadron to operations. By May that year, the squadron was fully manned and received a number of Avro 504 to train aircrew in preparation for operating more warlike aircraft. These arrived in February 1923 when the squadron, now based at RAF Spitalgate in Lincolnshire received 18 Airco DH.9As. As well as training for its role as a day bomber, the squadron also was chosen to perform a formation flying display at the RAF Air Pageant at Hendon in 1923, repeating its appearance in 1926 and 1927, when it flew joint formation flying and bombing displays with 207 Squadron. In January 1928, the squadron moved from Spitalgate to RAF Bircham Newton in Norfolk, where it began to prepare to a prospective move to British India.

In December 1929 it left the United Kingdom, leaving behind its DH.9As to equip No. 101 Squadron. It arrived at Risalpur, North-West Frontier Province India (now part of Pakistan) at the end of January 1929, receiving its complement of twelve Westland Wapitis (which had been shipped out separately) in March that year. It was used for Air Policing in the North West Frontier, carrying out bombing missions against rebelling tribesmen and their villages, and support for the army. In December 1931, it was re-equipped with Hawker Harts, operations continuing as before, also being used as part of the relief effort following the 1935 Quetta earthquake, flying supplies to devastated Quetta and carrying out medical evacuations. Major military operations included support of the Second Mohmand Campaign of 1935 against hostile tribesmen in Mohmand Territory, and operations against supporters of the Faqir of Ipi in 1938.

Second World War

In 1939, the squadron re-equipped with more modern Bristol Blenheim I twin-engined monoplane bombers. As the threat of war increased, it was decided to strengthen British defences in the Far East by moving No. 39 Squadron to Singapore, with the squadron setting off with nine Blenheims on 6 August. The ferry trip was a disaster, with six aircraft wrecked, and three men killed, including Wing Commander Burton Ankers, commander of the 2nd Indian Wing Station at Risalpur, whose Blenheim caught fire and crashed after being struck by lightning. In April 1940, the squadron was ordered back to India, arriving at Lahore on 25 April, and then to strengthen defences in the Middle East, being ordered to reinforce Aden, setting out on 5 May, with the air component reaching Aden on 13 May and the groundcrew arriving by ship on 10 June 1940.

On that day, Italy declared war on Great Britain and France, and No. 39 Squadron was quickly committed to action against Italian East Africa, carrying out its first combat mission of the war on 12 June when a force of Blenheims attacked Dire Dawa airfield in Ethiopia, causing little damage. The squadron continued operations against Italian forces until 24 November, when it was ordered to transfer to Egypt to support the planned offensive in the Western Desert (Operation Compass), with the first aircraft leaving Aden for Helwan on 29 November.

A detachment of three Blenheims operated with No. 45 Squadron over the Western Desert from 10 December, flying harassment raids against Italian-held airfields, while the remainder of the Squadron remained at Helwan while it recovered from the operations in East Africa, and started to replace its Blenheim Is with Blenheim IVs. In January, however, the squadron was ordered to recall the three aircraft detachment and hand over the squadron's Blenheims to 11 Squadron, which was to deploy to Greece. To replace its Blenheim IVs, 39 Squadron received Martin Maryland bombers, originally built for the French Air Force, becoming the first RAF squadron to operate the Maryland. Owing to the long-range of the Maryland, No. 39 Squadron used it mainly for reconnaissance. The squadron was heavily deployed during the Battle of Crete, claiming at least two Junkers Ju 52 transport aircraft shot down in the course of its operations during the battle.

In August–September 1941, the squadron partly converted to the Bristol Beaufort torpedo bomber for anti-shipping operations, although it retained a flight of Marylands until January 1942. At first the Squadron's Beauforts were armed with bombs but from January 1942 it added torpedo attack to its roles. On 23 January 1942, in the first torpedo attack by the squadron, three Beauforts set out an airfield near Benghazi against an Italian convoy carrying supplies to Tripoli, Libya. They hit the troopship and ex-liner  with two torpedoes. A third torpedo hit later that day by a Fairey Albacore of 826 Naval Air Squadron caused Victoria to sink. In late 1941 the unit was split up. One flight moved to Luqa, Malta in December 1941: six months later this flight was combined with others from Nos. 86 and 217 Squadrons to eventually form a new No. 39 Squadron. In 1943 the unit re-equipped with Bristol Beaufighter aircraft in the ground attack role and moved back to Egypt then on to Italy.  During the Greek Civil War, it sent rocket-armed aircraft to participate in RAF operations. In December 1944, it re-equipped with Martin Marauders, flying medium bombing missions in support of Tito's Partisans. It re-equipped with de Havilland Mosquitos in 1946, disbanding later in the year.

Cold War
It reformed as a fighter squadron equipped with the Hawker Tempest at Nairobi on 1 April 1948, disbanding on 28 February 1949, but reforming the next day at RAF Fayid in Egypt, flying de Havilland Mosquito NF Mk 36 night fighters. The squadron moved to nearby RAF Kabrit on 21 February 1951. As 1951 continued, tensions between the British forces in the Suez Canal Zone and the Egyptians, who wanted Britain to pull out of Egypt, and following anti-British riots in Cairo in January 1952, the squadron was put on standby to support plans for a British attack on Cairo if the situation further deteriorated, until the Egyptian army intervened and stopped the rioting, easing tensions a little. It re-equipped with Gloster Meteor NF.13 night fighters in March 1953, but following the Egyptian revolution of 1952, the situation for the British gradually became untenable, and in October 1954, the Anglo-Egyptian Agreement was signed, in which Britain agreed that its forces would leave Egypt by June 1956. As part of this agreement, No. 39 Squadron moved to RAF Luqa in Malta on 10 January 1955.

The squadron moved to RAF Akrotiri on Cyprus in August 1956 as Britain and France prepared a military response to the Egyptian Nationalisation of the Suez Canal. On 31 October, the British and French launched Operation Musketeer, a series of heavy air attacks against Egyptian targets followed by landings on 6 November. No. 39 Squadron's role was to protect the vital airfields on Cyprus from any potential Egyptian retaliation. Pressure from the UN forced a ceasefire in Egypt and a withdrawal of the Anglo-French forces by the end of December, but the squadron remained in Cyprus after the British forces dispersed, flying patrols to deter aircraft that were suspected of dropping supplies to EOKA forces fighting against the British rule of Cyprus. The main body of the squadron returned to Malta in March 1957, but a detachment was maintained on Cyprus. Tensions in Lebanon (which eventually culminated in the Lebanon Crisis of July–October 1958) caused the whole squadron to move to Cyprus in May 1958, but it soon returned to Malta and disbanded on 30 June 1958.

No. 39 Squadron reformed the next day at RAF Luqa by renumbering No. 69 Squadron, flying reconnaissance English Electric Canberra PR.3s in the high altitude reconnaissance role and assigned to the NATO Sixth Allied Tactical Air Force. It moved to RAF Wyton in September 1970, disbanding on 1 June 1982.

No. 1 Photographic Reconnaissance Unit

The squadron was reformed on 1 July 1992 when No. 1 Photographic Reconnaissance Unit (1 PRU) at RAF Wyton, equipped with Canberra PR.9 and T.4 aircraft was re-numbered No. 39 (1 PRU) Squadron. The unit moved to RAF Marham in December 1993, where it also received Canberra PR.7s. In December 1996, the squadron deployed to Uganda in order to search for Rwandan refugees in eastern Zaire after the Rwandan genocide. Between 1996 and 2001, No. 39 (1 PRU) Squadron deployed six times to Kenya and Zimbabwe to carry out photo-mapping. Between October 2001 and January 2002, the squadron deployed two Canberra PR.9s to Seeb International Airport, Oman, from where it undertook sorties over Afghanistan as part of Op VERITAS and Op ORACLE. In 2003, the unit deployed to Azraq Air Base, Jordan, in support of Operation Telic. On 8 September 2003, Canberra PR.9 XH168 was written off after bursting its main landing gear tyres upon touching down at RAF Marham, with the crew suffering no injuries. In November 2003, two Canberra PR.9s departed to RAF Mount Pleasant, Falkland Islands, to carry out survey work.

On 2 September 2004, Canberra T.4 WJ866 crashed at RAF Marham while carrying out a touch and go at night time, killing both pilots and injuring the navigator, this was the last operational Canberra loss for the RAF. No. 39 (1 PRU) Squadron carried out the last RAF flight of a Canberra T.4 (WJ874) on 1 September 2005, marking an end to 45 years of service, flying over locations associated with the type such as RAF Wyton, former RAF Bassingbourn and the former English Electric factory at Samlesbury Aerodrome.

In January 2006, No. 39 (1 PRU) Squadron deployed for the last time to Afghanistan in support of Operation Herrick, with the two Canberra PR.9s arriving back to RAF Marham on 23 June 2006 – marking an end to operational service for the Canberra. The squadron disbanded on 28 July 2006 at RAF Marham, with the occasion marked by a flypast and parade. The last three Canberras (XH131, XH134 and XH135) undertook their last flight from Marham to Kemble Airfield, Gloustershire, on 31 July 2006.

RPAS

In January 2005, a new unit, No. 1115 Flight, was formed at Creech Air Force Base in Nevada to operate the RAF's first Remotely-piloted Air System (RPAS). Operating the General Atomics MQ-1 Predator, the unit began training personnel in the operation of UAVs, prior to the stand up of a new squadron. No. 39 Squadron was reformed on 1 January 2007, with the former No. 1115 Flight becoming 'A' Flight, while 'B' Flight received the General Atomics MQ-9A Reaper. The squadron is supported and parented by RAF Waddington in Lincolnshire. On 9 November 2007, the Ministry of Defence announced that the squadron's MQ-9 Reapers had begun operations in Afghanistan against the Taliban. On 9 April 2008, MQ-9A Reaper ZZ200 was destroyed after it made a forced landing in southern Afghanistan in order stop it from falling into insurgents hands.

As of March 2009, the squadron operated 12 three-man teams to pilot its Reaper aircraft. Supporting intelligence specialists, Information Communications Technicians, signallers, and meteorologists bring the total number of squadron personnel to around 90. The squadron operated two aircraft but planned to have a total of six by the end of 2009. As of April 2011, five Reaper aircraft were in operation, with a further five on order and as of September 2016, the squadron, still based in Nevada, had ten operational Reaper aircraft and missions were being undertaken in Syria as part of Operation Shader.

No. 39 Squadron was awarded the battle honour 'Afghanistan 2001–2014' (without the right to emblazon) by Her Majesty Queen Elizabeth II on 24 March 2020 due to their participation in Operation Herrick. 

The squadron disbanded in August 2022, with a Reaper Ground Control System returning from Creech AFB to RAF Waddington for use by No. 13 Squadron.

Aircraft operated
From  except where stated

Royal Aircraft Factory BE.2c, d, e — April 1916 – 1917
Royal Aircraft Factory BE.12 —  April 1916 – 1917
 Royal Aircraft Factory SE.5a — 1917
 Bristol F.2 Fighter — 1917 – November 1918
 Avro 504 — 1921
 Airco DH.9A — February 1923 –December 1928
 Westland Wapiti — 1928 – November 1931
 Hawker Hart — November 1931 – August 1939
 Bristol Blenheim I, IV — August 1939 – January 1941
 Martin Maryland — January 1941 – January 1942
 Bristol Beaufort — August 1941 – June 1943
 Bristol Beaufighter — June 1943 – December 1944
 Martin Marauder — December 1944 –September 1946
 de Havilland Mosquito FB.VI, T3 — January 1946 – September 1946
 Hawker Tempest VI — June 1948 – March 1949
 de Havilland Mosquito NF.36, T.3 — June 1949 – March 1953
 Gloster Meteor NF.13 - March 1953- June 1958
 English Electric Canberra PR.3, PR.7, PR.9, T.4 — June 1958 – June 1982
 English Electric Canberra PR.9, PR.7 — July 1992 – July 2006
 General Atomics MQ-9 Reaper — January 2007 – August 2022

See also
List of Royal Air Force aircraft squadrons

References

Notes

Citations

Bibliography

 
 
 Chorlton, Martyn. Defenders of the North West Frontier. Aeroplane, Vol.39, No.8, August 2011. . pp. 24–28.
 
 
 
 
 
 
 
 Halley, James J. The Squadrons of the Royal Air Force & Commonwealth, 1918–1988. Tonbridge, Kent, UK: Air-Britain (Historians) Ltd., 1988. .
 Hatcher, Peter J. Partisan Wings: The Biferno Journal. The Story of No. 39 Squadron RAF, and its use of the Martin Marauder as part of the Balkan Air Force in support of the Partisan Army in Yugoslavia. Miami, Florida: Trente Nova Publishing, 1994.
 
 Jefford, C.G. RAF Squadrons, a Comprehensive Record of the Movement and Equipment of all RAF Squadrons and their Antecedents since 1912. Shrewsbury: Airlife Publishing, 2001. .
 
 
 
 
 
 
 
 
 
 
 Airforces monthly – April 2007

External links

 39 Squadron Web Page
 39 Squadron Association

039 Squadron
039 Squadron
Military units and formations established in 1916
1916 establishments in the United Kingdom
Military units and formations in Aden in World War II
R
Reconnaissance units and formations of the Royal Air Force